Mikelrypsh is a village in the Gagra District of Abkhazia.

Demographics
At the time of the 2011 Census, Mikelrypsh had a population of 326. Of these, 94.5% were Armenians, 2.1% Russians, 1.5% Georgians, 0.9% Abkhaz, 0.6% Ukrainians and 0.3% Greeks.

See also
 Gagra District

Notes

References

Gagra District Administration

Other

Populated places in Gagra District